Palos Township is one of 29 townships in Cook County, Illinois. As of the 2020 census, its population was 56,836, with its most populous municipality being Palos Hills (pop. 17,484). The vast majority of the township's population resides in its eastern half; the half west of La Grange Road consists mainly of facilities in the Cook County Forest Preserves. In 1850 the small town of Trenton, Illinois changed its name to Palos; this recommendation was made by M.S. Powell, the local postmaster, whose ancestor supposedly sailed with Christopher Columbus from Palos de la Frontera. When it incorporated as a village in 1914, Palos officially became Palos Park. The neighboring communities of Palos Hills and Palos Heights incorporated at later points. All three municipalities lie completely or substantially within Palos Township.

Township offices are located at 10802 S. Roberts Road in Palos Hills. Other municipalities with significant portions in the township include Hickory Hills, Worth and Bridgeview. Palos Township's approximate borders are Harlem Avenue (Illinois Route 43) on the east, 135th Street on the south, Will-Cook Road extended to the DuPage County line on the west, and 87th Street on the north; in the northwest, the township border follows the Des Plaines River from 87th Street to DuPage County's southeast corner. The Chicago Sanitary and Ship Canal, designated a National Historic District in 2011, passes through the township just south of the river, and the Cal-Sag Channel roughly bisects the township from east to west.

Township services
According to Illinois law, townships are responsible for the maintenance of township roadways, the governance of the General Assistance program and the assessment of real property. In Cook County, townships are not responsible for assessing real property as the Cook County Assessor performs that function.

Some townships have adopted other duties, including the provision of health services. Palos Township runs a health service providing low- or no-cost physical examinations, sick visits, cholesterol tests and screenings, pregnancy tests, blood pressure screening, immunizations, podiatry services for senior citizens and other services.

Other services provided by Palos Township include free tax preparation for senior citizens, temporary handicapped placards, voter services, speaker's bureau, and much more.

Geography

Borders
Palos Township is bordered on the north by Lyons Township, on the east by Worth Township, on the south by Orland Township, and on the west by Lemont Township. The northwest border with Lyons Township follows the Des Plaines River, directly adjacent to the Chicago Sanitary and Ship Canal (managed by the Metropolitan Water Reclamation District of Greater Chicago) which connects Lake Michigan with the Mississippi River.

Other bordering township include Homer Township (Will County) on the southwest corner; Bremen Township (Cook County) on the southeast corner; Stickney Township (Cook County) on the northeast corner and Downers Grove Township (DuPage County) on the northwest corner.

Cities, towns, villages
 Bridgeview (the quarter southwest of 87th Street and Harlem Avenue)
 Hickory Hills (all but the small portion north of 87th Street)
 Orland Park (the small area north of 135th Street)
 Palos Heights (the half west of Harlem)
 Palos Hills
 Palos Park (all but a small area west of Will-Cook Road)
 Willow Springs (the largely non-residential portion south of 87th Street and east of the Des Plaines River, and east of the DuPage County line)
 Worth (the third west of Harlem)

Unincorporated Towns
 Southmoor at

Adjacent townships
 Lyons Township (north)
 Stickney Township (northeast)
 Worth Township (east)
 Bremen Township (southeast)
 Orland Township (south)
 Homer Township, Will County (southwest)
 Lemont Township (west)
 Downers Grove Township, DuPage County (northwest)

Cemeteries
The township contains three cemeteries: Fairmount-Willow Hills, Oak Hill and Sacred Heart Catholic.

Major highways
  Interstate 294
  U.S. Route 12
  U.S. Route 20
  U.S. Route 45
  Illinois Route 7
  Illinois Route 43
  Illinois Route 83
  Illinois Route 171

Airports and landing strips
 Palos Community Hospital Heliport

Lakes
 Bull Frog Lake
 Hambone Lake
 Horsetail Lake
 Maple Lake
 Papoose Lake
 Tuma Lake

Landmarks
 Orland Grove Forest Preserve
 Palos Sag-Valley Forest Preserve

These Cook County Forest Preserves woods:
 Burr Oak Woods (west quarter)
 Cherry Hill Woods
 Crooked Creek Woods
 Forty Acres Woods
 Groundhog Slough Woods
 Henry De Tonty
 Hickory Hills Woods
 Hidden Pond Woods
 Mcclaughry Springs Woods
 Mcmahon Woods
 Paddock Woods
 Palos Park Woods
 Paw Paw Woods
 Pioneer Woods
 Pulaski Woods
 Saganashkee Slough Woods
 Spears Woods
 Swallow Cliff Woods
 Tampier Slough Woods (east half)
 White Oak Woods
 Willow Springs Woods
 Wolf Road Woods

Demographics

Governance
Palos Township is governed by a township board of trustees sometimes called the township board or town board. The town board consists of five voting members and includes the elected township supervisor and four elected township trustees.

The town board is responsible for providing a budget and taxes sufficient to run the operations of the township government each year. The supervisor is a voting member of the town board but is also the chief executive officer and the chief financial officer of the township.

The township clerk, assessor and highway commissioner are elected officials; however, they do not have a vote on the town board.

Duties and powers of the supervisor

The township supervisor is the chief executive officer of the township and is responsible for the day-to-day operations of the township along with the following other duties:
Chairing all meetings of the township board;
Serving as township treasurer;
Serving as supervisor of General Assistance;
Serving as supervisor of buildings and grounds.

Current township elected officials

Supervisor Colleen Grant-Schumann (R-Palos Heights)
Clerk Jane Nolan (D- Palos Hills)
Assessor Robert E. Maloney (D-Palos Hills)
Highway Commissioner Gene Adams (R-Palos Park)
Trustee Brent Woods (R-Worth) – Supervisor Pro-Tem
Trustee Richard C. Riley (R-Palos Hills)
Trustee Tasneem Abuzir (I-Bridgeview)
Trustee Pam Jeanes (R-Palos Park)

Education
 Moraine Valley Community College
 Amos Alonzo Stagg High School – Consolidated High School District 230
 Carl Sandburg High School – Consolidated High School District 230
 Conrady Junior High School – North Palos School District 117
 Glen Oaks Elementary School – North Palos School District 117
 Oak Ridge Elementary School – North Palos School District 117
 Dorn Elementary School – North Palos School District 117
 Sorrick Elementary School – North Palos School District 117
 Palos East Elementary School – Palos School District 118
 Palos West Elementary School – Palos School District 118
 Palos South Elementary School – Palos School District 118
 Worthwoods Elementary School – Worth School District 127

Political districts
 Illinois's 6th congressional district – Congressman Sean Casten (D-Downers Grove)
 State Senate District 16 – Senator Willie Preston (D-Chicago)
 State Senate District 18 – Senator William Cunnigham (D-Chicago)
 State Senate District 41 – Senator John F. Curran (R-Lemont)
 State House District 31 – Representative Mary E. Flowers (D-Chicago)
 State House District 32 – Representative Cyril Nichols (D-Chicago)
 State House District 35 – Representative Fran Hurley (D-Chicago)
 State House District 36 – Representative Kelly Burke (D-Evergreen Park)
 State House District 82 – Representative John Egofske (R-Lemont)
 Cook County Board District 6 – Commissioner Donna Miller (D-Lynwood)
 Cook County Board District 17 – Commissioner Sean M. Morrison (R-Palos Park)
 Cook County Board of (Tax) Review District 1 – Commissioner George Cardenas (D-Chicago)
 Cook County Board of (Tax) Review District 3 – Commissioner Larry Rodgers (D-Chicago)
 4th Judicial Sub-Circuit
 15th Judicial Sub-Circuit

Voting History

Palos Township has been a generally Republican jurisdiction in presidential elections, having voted for nine of the last ten Republican presidential candidates.

References
 
 United States Census Bureau 2007 TIGER/Line Shapefiles
 United States National Atlas

External links
 Palos Township official website
 City-Data.com
 Illinois State Archives
 Township Officials of Illinois
 Cook County official site

Townships in Cook County, Illinois
Townships in Illinois